Dragan Šolak (born 30 March 1980) is a Turkish-Serbian chess grandmaster.

Career
Šolak learnt chess from a very young age and started participating in tournaments before he turned four years of age. In 2002 he tied for 1st–3rd with Vladimir Tukmakov and Andrei Sokolov in the Hilton Open in Basel and tied for 3rd–4th with Ketino Kachiani-Gersinska in the Casino Open in Interlaken. In 2011 he tied for 3rd–7th with Sergey Volkov, Ioannis Nikolaidis, Konstantine Shanava and Fernando Peralta in the 1st Isthmia International Tournament.

He played for the Yugoslav (later Serbian) national team in the Chess Olympiads of 2000, 2004, 2008 and in the European Team Chess Championships of 1999, 2005, 2009 and 2011.

In December 2011 he transferred to the Turkish Chess Federation. Šolak represented Turkey at the Chess Olympiads of 2012, 2014, 2016 and at the European Team Championship of 2013. He won the Turkish Chess Championship in 2012 and 2013.

Šolak finished equal second (fourth on tiebreak) at the European Individual Chess Championship of 2014 scoring 8 points out of 11 and this result enabled him to qualify for the 2015 Chess World Cup.
In 2015 he won the 17th Dubai Open, edging out other five grandmasters on tiebreak, after all finished on 7/9 points. At the Chess World Cup 2015 he lost in the first round to Anton Korobov and therefore was eliminated from the competition.

His handle on the Internet Chess Club is "RuznaMamuna".

References

External links

1980 births
Living people
Serbian chess players
Turkish chess players
Chess grandmasters
Chess Olympiad competitors
People from Vrbas, Serbia